Angélica María Cepeda Jiménez (born 2 August 1974), professionally known as Angie Cepeda, is a Colombian actress. She is best known for her roles in the telenovela Pobre Diabla and the films Captain Pantoja and the Special Services and Love in the Time of Cholera. She is the younger sister of actress Lorna Paz.

Early life 
Cepeda was born in Cartagena de Indias, Colombia, and raised in Barranquilla. After her parents divorced she lived with her mother and two older sisters (one of whom is actress Lorna Paz).

Career 
When she discovered her vocation in drama, she moved out to Bogotá.  After starting her drama courses, she was contracted by a beer company and made some advertisements for it. Next, she played some bit parts in several soap operas and movies in Colombia.

Cepeda got a role in the soap opera Las Juanas, getting the attention of some TV producers who offered her  jobs in prime time shows, such as the  leading role in Luz Maria (1998), co-starring Christian Meier and Rosalinda Serfaty, and that as Fiorella Morelli Flores de Mejía Guzmán in Pobre Diabla (2000), opposite Salvador del Solar and Santiago Magill.
 
In the cinematic world, Peruvian director Francisco Lombardi convinced her to portray a prostitute called "La Colombiana" in Pantaleón y las Visitadoras (released in English as Captain Pantoja and the Special Services). In 2021, she voiced Julieta Madrigal in the English, Spanish and Italian language versions of the Disney animated musical film Encanto.

Filmography

Awards and nominations

References

External links 

1974 births
20th-century Colombian actresses
Colombian female models
Colombian film actresses
Colombian telenovela actresses
Colombian television actresses
Living people
People from Barranquilla
People from Cartagena, Colombia
21st-century Colombian actresses